Lynden B. Miller (born December 8, 1938) is an author, an advocate for public parks and gardens, and a garden designer, best known for her restoration of the Conservatory Garden in New York’s Central Park, completed in 1987.

Education and early career
Lynden Ryder Breed grew up in Washington, D. C. and New York. Through her mother, she is a descendant of a long line of lawyers and jurists including Judge William Butler Hornblower. She attended Chapin School (Class of 1956), and graduated from Smith College (Class of 1960), where she studied art and spent her junior year abroad at the University of Florence. She married Leigh Miller, an attorney, in 1966.

Miller pursued a career in fine art painting which spanned 18 years. Combining her aesthetic talents and training, knowledge gained from horticultural classes in Chelsea-Westminster College in England and instruction at the New York Botanical Garden, Miller first designed her own garden at her home in Sharon, Connecticut in 1979. Her selection of plants was influenced by her desire to fill the space like a canvas with texture and color in every season. She experimented with a broad palette of colors and range of native flora, shrubs, annuals and perennials to create her signature painterly plantings.

Conservatory Garden, Central Park
In 1982, Elizabeth Barlow Rogers, a friend who at the time was the Administrator of Central Park, invited Miller to help restore the Conservatory Garden, six neglected and vandalized acres located near Fifth Avenue and 104th Street. Miller raised the money for the project herself, and recruited volunteers to help her replant the overgrown East Harlem garden. Her efforts came at a time when the park was considered by some to be dangerous. The result was a lush refuge that reopened in June 1987. In a 2019 interview, Miller said, "There's something really quite wonderful about being able to bring up connection with nature to people, especially who live in a city."

Career and commissions

Public parks
Miller's very visible success with Central Park led to subsequent commissions, collaborative plantings and redesigns of established gardens. She has been lauded for designs and renewals of numerous urban spaces such as Bryant Park and referred to as "New York City's very own Miss Rumphius" for bringing beauty to everyone. Examples include:
  Miller helped Laurie Olin with the design of Robert F. Wagner, Jr. Park in Battery Park City in 1979.
 Bryant Park closed in 1988 and when it reopened in 1992, Miller's effective intervention resulted in an oasis that drew people to the park in the spring, summer, fall and winter.
 Miller redesigned the Jane Watson Irwin Perennial Garden at New York Botanical Garden to ensure four season color. The original plan was by Dan Kiley.
 Madison Square Park - In 2010, Miller was hired to reconfigure the planting beds.
 The Heather Garden at Fort Tryon Park has a garden created by Miller and partner Brands
 Chelsea Cove Entry Garden at Hudson River Park (Pier 62) - The garden designed by Miller opened in May 2010 
 The British Garden at Hanover Square For this garden designed by Julian and Isabel Bannerman, and commemorating the victims of the September 11, 2001 attacks, Miller collaborated with Ronda M. Brands on the installation of species typical of a British garden.
 Trinity Churchyard 
 Two gardens at the Bayard Cutting Arboretum
 Pier 44 Waterfront Garden in Red Hook 
 She is currently working on reimagining the Russell Page Garden at the Frick Collection which was previously slated for demolition.

Campuses
University campuses such as Columbia University Princeton University, and Stony Brook University have sought out Miller's expertise. In 1996, Miller was asked to update the gardens at Columbia in time for the Centennial observation of their move to the Morningside campus. At Princeton, Miller was invited in 2005 to work with Michael Van Valkenburgh as the university's consulting gardening architect, focusing on the 17 gardens that are distributed throughout the campus. As part of a team that included architects Beyer Blinder Belle, they sought ways to make planting choices that respected the history of the property but also took climate change into account such as installing fewer annuals and substituting perennials.

Initiatives
Miller is adamant about working on public gardens rather than private properties. A good example of this is her collaboration with Dutch bulb grower Hans van Waardenburg in the aftermath of the September 11 attacks; Miller launched and co-founded the Daffodil Project and together with NYC Parks Commissioner Adrian Benepe and the New York City Department of Parks and Recreation, she led the planting of thousands of daffodils throughout the park system to honor the victims of the attack. As of 2019, over 7.5 million daffodils have been planted in parks, school yards, community gardens and tree beds on sidewalks throughout the five boroughs. Miller's contributions to this program were recognized with the naming of a narcissus "Lovely Lynden" in her honor.

Books and film
Miller has lectured widely on garden design, horticulture and advocacy for public spaces. She has written articles for numerous magazines and botanical publications including Fine Gardening, the Royal Horticultural Society Journal, American
Nurseryman, and American Horticulturist. Her book, Parks, Plants, and People: Beautifying the Urban Landscape won a Horticultural Society National Book Award in 2010. The book details not only her approach to designing attractive gardens for public use but also how to secure funding and volunteers for these maintenance heavy endeavors. Miller's central tenet is "Make it gorgeous and they will come. Keep it that way and they will help."

Most recently she narrated and hosted a documentary about one of America's most notable landscape architects, Beatrix Jones Farrand called Beatrix Farrand, American Landscapes. The film was directed by Stephen Ives and produced by Anne Cleves Symmes.

Teaching
Miller started teaching at NYU in 2006 as an Adjunct Professor in their Urban Design and Architecture Program.

Philanthropy
Miller serves on the Boards of the Central Park Conservancy, the New York Botanical Garden and New Yorkers for Parks. She is also a member of the Friends of the Botanic Garden Advisory Committee at Smith College.

Awards
 2019 Landscape Award, LongHouse Reserve
 2018 Living Landmark Award, New York Landmarks Conservancy 
 2012 August Heckscher Award for Community Service, CIVITAS
 2011 George Robert White Medal, Massachusetts Horticultural Society
 Frederick Law Olmsted Award, Central Park Conservancy
 2006 Vail Medal, Cleveland Botanical Garden,  for "significant national contributions to the field of horticulture"
 1993 Elvira Broome Doolan Medal, Garden Club of America, "Presented for her diligence and belief in the refreshing quality of plants, coupled with a sensitivity for people working together to make things happen, giving her the impetus to envision new gardens for New York City."

Personal life
Miller is married to Leigh Miller and has two sons, Marshall and Gifford and two step-sons, Ethan and Christian. Her son  Gifford Miller is a politician.

References

External links
Public Garden Design website

1938 births
American landscape and garden designers
Living people
Central Park
Chapin School (Manhattan) alumni
Smith College alumni
People from New York (state)